Jack Christopher Truelove (born 27 December 1995) is former English Football League footballer with Oldham Athletic.

Career

Oldham Athletic 
Truelove made his professional debut for Oldham Athletic on 27 April 2013, as a second-half substitute in the game against Leyton Orient at Brisbane Road.

Truelove signed his first professional contract on 1 July 2014, signing a one-year contract with an option for a second.

On 11 May 2015, the Latics announced that Truelove was Oldham's Community Trust Player of the Season.

Following his loan-move to National League North side Brackley Town in September 2015, Truelove scored his first ever competitive goal in The Saints' 3–1 win over Tooting & Mitcham United in the FA Cup second round qualifying.

On 3 December 2015, Truelove joined National League North side Curzon Ashton on a 28-day youth loan, which proved to be fruitful for both the club and the player. Truelove made quite an impression during his stay at the Tameside Stadium, so much so that the Nash faithful even chanted a song about the Latics' fullback, appropriately titled: 'It must be love, Truelove' – a throw-back to the classic Madness anthem: 'It must be love', which topped in the UK charts at number 4 in 1983.

In a bid to help preserve their National League status, Oldham Athletic agreed to loan Truelove to Hednesford Town on another 28-day youth-loan. He made his debut for The Pitmen in the 4–1 win over Stafford Rangers in the Staffordshire Senior Cup on 19 January 2016. At the end of the initial loan period, Truelove's loan was extended at Keys Park until the end of the 2015/6 season.

Curzon Ashton 

After being released by Oldham Athletic in May 2016, Truelove signed for National League North side Curzon Ashton in a bid to maintain a level of match fitness. He played just two games for The Nash against Chorley and Worcester City before agreeing a move to Mornington Soccer Club, which play in Australian Men's State League 1 South-East division.

Padiham 

On 13 June 2019, Truelove signed for North West Counties Premier League side Padiham

Up-to-date, as of 29 December 2016.

References

External links 
 
 Profile at Oldham Athletic AFC website

1995 births
Living people
Footballers from Burnley
Oldham Athletic A.F.C. players
Stalybridge Celtic F.C. players
Colwyn Bay F.C. players
Brackley Town F.C. players
Curzon Ashton F.C. players
Hednesford Town F.C. players
English Football League players
English footballers
Association football defenders